Camella Inc. also known as simply Camella, is a house and lot and condominium developer in the Philippines. It is the flagship subsidiary of Vista Land, which is part of the Villar Group of Companies associated with Manny Villar.

History
Camella was founded by Manuel B. Villar, Jr. in August 1977. Villar took out a seven-year loan from a rural bank offering low interest rates then kick-started building and selling at his first project, Camella Homes Phase 1 and 2 in Las Piñas, with 160 units initially. The company became the pioneer for developing house and lot packages in the country when the usual practice at that time was to sell lots for future homeowners to build on. This initiated the mass housing projects through economies of scale, utilizing the cost advantages of developing a large-scale project to bring down housing prices. Camella has since become the country's largest home building company.

Accolades
Camella has been recognized by Reader's Digest as Asia’s Trusted Brand in property development from 2012 to 2017.

In 2016, Camella's Camella Palawan resort was named as Best Housing Development by the Philippines Property Awards.

References

Real estate companies of the Philippines
Philippine companies established in 1977
Companies based in Mandaluyong
Real estate companies established in 1977